Acacia amyctica is a shrub of the genus Acacia and the subgenus Plurinerves. It is native to an area in the south of the Goldfields-Esperance region of Western Australia.

Description
It has smooth, light-grey coloured bark and slightly ribbed and sparsely haired branchlets. Like most species of Acacia it has phyllodes rather than true leaves. The evergreen ascending to erect phyllodes have a narrowly oblanceolate to elliptic-oblanceolate shape and can be straight to slightly curved. It blooms from August to September and produces yellow flowers.

Distribution
It has a limited distribution from around Salmon Gums and Grass Patch in the east and around Peak Charles National Park and around Dunn Swamp where it is found on flats and plains growing in sandy clay to loamy soils as a part of low woodland and open shrubland communities.

See also
List of Acacia species

References

amyctica
Acacias of Western Australia
Plants described in 1995
Taxa named by Bruce Maslin